OOW may refer to:

 EverQuest: Omens of War, a massively multiplayer online role-playing game (MMORPG)
 Officer of watch; see Watchstanding
 Oklahoma Ordnance Works
  Out of warranty 
Out Of Work